UPF0528 protein FAM172A is a protein that in humans is encoded by the FAM172A gene.

References

External links

Further reading